The Episcopate of the Kenyan Armed Forces is an Anglican See in the Anglican Church of Kenya: founded in 2009, the current bishop is The Rt Revd Colonel Peter Simiyu.

Notes

Anglican Church of Kenya
Kenya
2009 establishments in Kenya
Military of Kenya
Anglican dioceses of Mombasa